Cameraria magnisignata is a moth of the family Gracillariidae. It is known from Delhi, India.

The wingspan is 5.5-6.4 mm.

The larvae feed on Pongamia species, including Pongamia pinnata. They mine the leaves of their host plant. The mine has the form of a circular or oblong blotch-mine occurring upon the upper side of the leaflet, usually placed on veins. It is very flat and whitish-green with a brownish central patch of frass at a young stage, then deformed into a slightly tentiform type and discoloured into white at fully mature stage. The loosened upper epidermis of the mine is slightly contracted by silken threads, but no distinct wrinkles are visible. Pupation takes place within a thin, whitish, ellipsoidal cocoon, which is placed in the centre of the mine.

References

Cameraria (moth)
Moths of Asia
Moths described in 1993

Leaf miners
Lepidoptera of India
Taxa named by Tosio Kumata